The following is a comprehensive discography of Neil Sedaka, the American singer.

Original studio albums

1950s
1959: Rock with Sedaka (titled 'Neil Sedaka' in some territories)

1960s
1961: Circulate (10 of the 12 songs are covers of 1930s-1950s standards; released in Japan under the title Look To The Rainbow) 
1961: Neil Sedaka Sings Little Devil and His Other Hits 
1963: Three Great Guys (with Paul Anka and Sam Cooke)
1969: Workin' on a Groovy Thing (released in the UK as Sounds of Sedaka)

1970s
1971: Emergence 
1972: Solitaire (titled Neil Sedaka in some territories) 
1973: The Tra-La Days Are Over 
1974: Laughter In The Rain 
1974: Sedaka's Back (US) 
1975: Overnight Success (titled The Hungry Years in some territories) 
1976: Steppin' Out 
1977: A Song 
1978: All You Need Is the Music

1980s
1980: In the Pocket
1981: Neil Sedaka: Now 
1983: Come See About Me 
1986: The Good Times

1990s
1995: Classically Sedaka
1998: Tales of Love (and Other Passions)

2000s
2003: Brighton Beach Memories — Neil Sedaka Sings Yiddish
2005: The Miracle of Christmas (2-CD set)
2009: Waking Up Is Hard to Do (children's recording)

2010s
2010: The Music of My Life 
2012: The Real Neil (his first acoustic album, with just piano and voice)
2016: I Do It for Applause

Compilations, live albums and foreign-language albums

1960s
1963: Neil Sedaka Sings His Greatest Hits (also known as Greatest Hits 1959-63) 
1963: Neil Sedaka Canta en Espanol
1964: Mas Neil Sedaka en Espanol
1964: Neil Sedaka: Italiano
1965: Neil Sedaka: Italiano Volume 2
1966: Smile
1966: My Yiddishe Momme: Neil Sedaka at Chequers

1970s
1970: Oh! Carol
1974: Live at the Royal Festival Hall (UK; live)
1974: Oh Carol 
1974: On Stage (issued in the US in 1976 as Live in Australia & in Brazil as Ao Vivo)
1975: All-Time Greatest Hits
1975: Pop Power: The Fantastic Neil Sedaka
1976: Let's Go Steady Again 
1976: Pure Gold
1976: Sedaka Live in Australia at the South Sydney Junior Leagues Club 
1976: Breaking Up Is Hard to Do: The Original Hit
1976: Stupid Cupid (RCA Camden album)
1976: Laughter and Tears: The Best of Neil Sedaka Today 
1977: Neil Sedaka's Greatest Hits
1977: Neil Sedaka and Songs — A Solo Concert (live 2-LP) 
1977: Neil Sedaka and Songs
1977: Neil Sedaka: The '50s and '60s
1997: Neil Sedaka: 14 Knockouts
1978: The Many Sides of Neil Sedaka 
1979: Let's Go Steady Again 
1979: Sunny

1980s
1980: Neil Sedaka's Greatest Hits
1982: Is Anybody Gonna Miss You? 
1982: Sedaka Live at Sun City (South African release of the "On Stage album from 1974)
1986: My Friend
1988: All-Time Greatest Hits

1990s
1991: All Time Greatest Hits, Vol. 2
1991: Timeless — The Very Best of Neil Sedaka 
1991: The Collection
1991: Neil Sedaka's Diary
1992: Greatest Hits Live
1992: Love Will Keep Us Together 
1992: Tuneweaver 
1994: Laughter in the Rain: The Best of Neil Sedaka, 1974-80
1994: A Personal Collection
1994: The Singer & His Songs
1995: Song Cycle (songs culled from "Emergence" [1971] and "Solitaire" [1972])
1995: I Successi Di Neil Sedaka (compilation of Italian-language recordings)
1996: Neil Sedaka By Popular Demand
1996: Neil Sedaka in Italiano (2-CD edition of his 1960s Italian recordings)
1997: What a Difference a Day Makes: The Neil Sedaka Collection
1999: The Very Best of Neil Sedaka (2-CD set)

2000s
2001: RCA 100th Anniversary Series: The Very Best Of Neil Sedaka
2002: Let the Good Times In 
2003: Oh! Carol: The Complete Recordings, 1955-66 (8-CD box with previously unreleased material)
2003: Neil Sedaka: The Brooklyn Demos, 1958-61
2003: Platinum and Gold Collection
2003: The Show Goes On 
2004: Stairway to Heaven: The Best of Neil Sedaka
2005: Love Songs
2006: The Very Best of Neil Sedaka:  The Show Goes On (2-CD)
2006: Neil Sedaka Live at the Royal Albert Hall – The Very Best of Neil Sedaka: The Show Goes On (2 DVD set filmed 7 April 2006 in London)
2007: The Definitive Collection (2-CD)
2007: Oh! Carol 
2009: Flashback (compilation of Italian recordings)
2009: Waking Up Is Hard to Do 
2009: The Miracle of Christmas:  The Deluxe Edition

2010s and 2020s
2010: The Music of My Life
2010: Neil Sedaka Sings Little Devil and His Other Hits / The Many Sides of Neil Sedaka (a combo re-release of his 1961 and 1978 albums as listed above)
2010: Neil Sedaka 
2011: "Oh! Carol" and All the Early Classics
2011: I Must Be Dreaming 
2011: The Sedaka Sessions 
2011: Where the Boys Are: The Music of Neil Sedaka and Howard Greenfield 
2012: Neil Sedaka: Hit Maker 
2013: The Things I Love
2013: The Essential Early Recordings (2-CD set)
2013: The Drugstore's Rockin' 
2013: Neil Sedaka In The Studio, 1958-1962
2013: Neil Sedaka Live at the Royal Albert Hall 
2014: Neil Sedaka: Hits Around the World
2014: Neil Sedaka in the Studio, 1958-1962, Vol. 2
2014: The Complete Singles and EPs: As and Bs, 1956-1962 
2014: Neil Sedaka Songbook (2-CD set)
2016: Greatest Hits
2022: All You Need Is The Music: The Elektra Years (1977-1981) (2-CD album containing complete contents of Sedaka's four Elektra albums - A Song  [1977], All You Need Is the Music [1978], In the Pocket [1980], and Neil Sedaka: Now [1981])

EPs

English-language singles

1950s

1960s

1970s

1980s to 1990s

Foreign-language singles

In Italian
All singles were released on the RCA Victor label except for "L'Addio"/"Passo E Chiudo" which was released on the Atlantic label.

In German
All singles were released on the RCA label.

In other languages

§ - "Manuela" and "Lunita Consejera" were derived from the 1964 Italian-Argentine film Il Gaucho.

References

Discographies of American artists
Discography